Bivongi (Calabrian:  or ) is a comune (municipality) in the Province of Reggio Calabria in the Italian region Calabria, located about  southwest of Catanzaro and about  northeast of Reggio Calabria in the Stilaro Valley, at the feet of the Monte Consolino.

Sister city 
  La Plata (Argentina) 2012

See also
Calabrian wine
Vallata dello Stilaro Allaro
Ecomuseo delle ferriere e fonderie di Calabria

References

External links
Bivongi in Locride's site
Comunità Montana Stilaro Allaro
An access point to Bivongi internet resources

Cities and towns in Calabria
Vallata dello Stilaro